Events from the year 1806 in Spain

Incumbents
 Monarch – Charles IV

Events

Births

 

 January 27 – Juan Crisóstomo Arriaga, Spanish composer (d. 1826)

Deaths

 
 
 
 - Manuel Abad y Lasierra

References

 
Years of the 19th century in Spain